The Miss Universe Canada 2005 pageant was held on March 1, 2005. The winner represented Canada in the Miss Universe 2005 and won its second crown. The first runner-up represented Canada in Miss International 2005.

Final results

Special Awards

Official Delegates
Meet the 33 national delegates competing for the title of Miss Universe Canada 2005:

References

External links
 Official Website
 Miss Universe Canada 2005 Results

2005
2005 in Toronto
2005 beauty pageants